Rhododendron minus var. chapmanii (syn. Rhododendron chapmanii), also known as Chapman's rhododendron, is an endangered variety, endemic to Florida, of the evergreen Piedmont rhododendron.

Description
Chapman's rhododendron grows to 2 metres tall and has an erect habit. New growth is red-brown, turning gray with age. The leaves are elliptic and are 3 to 6.5 cm long.  Pink flowers with 5 petals and 10 stamens appear in the spring (March to April in Florida).

Distribution
There are three separate populations of the species within Florida, one in Clay County, the second in Gulf County and the third on the county line of Gadsden and Liberty counties.

References

minus var. chapmanii
Endemic flora of Florida
Endangered flora of the United States
Flora without expected TNC conservation status